Amphixystis is a genus of moths belonging to the family Tineidae. The family was first described by Edward Meyrick in 1901.

Hostplant records are only known for 2 species of this genus: Amphixystis anchiala had been recorded feeding on Euphorbia resinifera, Citrullus colocynthis (Cucurbitaceae), Dioscorea alata and Dioscorea rotundata (Dioscoreaceae) and Amphixystis syntricha  that feeds on Pandanus montanus (Pandanaceae).

Species
Some species of this genus are:

Amphixystis aethalopis  (from Mauritius)
Amphixystis anachoreta  (from Zimbabwe)
Amphixystis anchiala  (from South Africa and Madagascar)
Amphixystis antiloga  (from Australia)
Amphixystis antongilella  (from Madagascar)
Amphixystis aromaticella  (from Réunion and Madagascar)
Amphixystis artiphanes  (Sri Lanka)
Amphixystis beverrasella  (from the Seychelles)
Amphixystis canthopa  (from Mauritius)
Amphixystis chrysodora  (from Mauritius)
Amphixystis cincinnata  (Sri Lanka)
Amphixystis colubrina  (from Malawi)
Amphixystis commatias  (Sri Lanka)
Amphixystis copidora  (Sri Lanka)
Amphixystis crobylora  (from the Seychelles)
Amphixystis crocinacma  (from Mauritius)
Amphixystis crypsirias  (from Mauritius)
Amphixystis cymataula  (from Zimbabwe)
Amphixystis cyanodesma  (from the Seychelles)
Amphixystis ensifera  (from the Seychelles)
Amphixystis epirota  (from Malawi)
Amphixystis fragosa  (from Mauritius)
Amphixystis fricata  (from the Seychelles & Madagascar)
Amphixystis glomerata  (from the Seychelles)
Amphixystis guttata  (from Réunion)
Amphixystis gyracma  (India)
Amphixystis hapsimacha  (from New Zealand) 
Amphixystis herbulotella  (from Madagascar)
Amphixystis hermatias  (from the Seychelles)
Amphixystis heteroclina  (Sri Lanka)
Amphixystis hydrochalca  (from Mauritius)
Amphixystis hypolampes  (from Australia)
Amphixystis ichnora  (from the Seychelles)
Amphixystis irenica  (from the Seychelles)
Amphiyxstis islamella  (Libya, Oman, Yemen)
Amphixystis lactiflua  (from the Seychelles)
Amphixystis ligyropa  (Sri Lanka)
Amphixystis maillardella  (from Réunion)
Amphixystis maroccana  (from Maroccos)
Amphixystis multipunctella  (from the Seychelles)
Amphixystis minuta  (from Yemen)
Amphixystis nephalia  (from the Seychelles)
Amphixystis oxymoris  (India)
Amphixystis paroditella  (from Réunion)
Amphixystis patelia  (from Réunion)
Amphixystis polystrigella  (from the Seychelles)
Amphixystis protelesta  (India)
Amphixystis rhodothicta  (from the Seychelles)
Amphixystis rhothiaula  (from the Seychelles)
Amphixystis rorida  (from the Seychelles)
Amphixystis rotata  (India)
Amphixystis roseostrigella  (from the Seychelles)
Amphixystis sciadocoma  (from Mauritius)
Amphixystis selacta  (from the Seychelles)
Amphixystis serrata  (from Mauritius, Reunion & Malawi)
Amphixystis sicaria  (from the Seychelles)
Amphixystis siccata  (from Mauritius)
Amphixystis spathistis  (from Mauritius)
Amphixystis syntricha  (from Réunion, Mauritius & South Africa)
Amphixystis tachygrapha  (Sri Lanka)
Amphixystis tarsota  (from the Seychelles)
Amphiyxstis taurus  (from Yemen)
Amphixystis thapsonota  (India)
Amphixystis trixysta  (from Mauritius)

References

Gaedike, R., 2009: Neue oder wenig bekannte Tineidae aus Mauretania, Morocco, Algeria und Tunisien (Lepidoptera). Beiträge zur Entomologie 59 (2): 489–512.
Gaedike, R. 2014. On the Tineidae of the Southern Arabian Peninsula and Sudan (Lepidoptera: Tineidae). - Beiträge zur Entomologie 64(2): 193–219.

Tineidae
Taxa named by Edward Meyrick
Tineidae genera